3DMark is a computer benchmarking tool created and developed by UL, (formerly Futuremark), to determine the  performance of a computer's 3D graphic rendering and CPU workload processing capabilities. Running 3DMark produces a 3DMark score, with higher numbers indicating better performance. The 3DMark measurement unit is intended to give a normalized means for comparing different PC hardware configurations (mostly graphics processing units and central processing units), which proponents such as gamers and overclocking enthusiasts assert is indicative of end-user performance capabilities.

Many versions of 3DMark have been released since 1998. Scores cannot be compared across versions as each test is based on a specific version of the DirectX API. 3DMark 11 and earlier versions, being no longer suitable to test modern hardware, have been made available as freeware by providing keys to unlock the full version on the UL website.

Versions

See also 
 Benchmark (computing)
 PCMark
 Futuremark

References

External links
 3DMark website
 UL benchmarks 

1998 software
Benchmarks (computing)
Software developed in Finland